Bummers was a nickname applied to foragers of Maj. Gen. William Tecumseh Sherman's Union army during its March to the Sea and north through South Carolina and North Carolina during the American Civil War.

History

Origin
The designation "bummers" was used, both by soldiers and civilians, to describe Sherman's soldiers, official and unofficial, who "requisitioned" food from Southern homes along the route of the Army's march. Often highly destructive in nature, bummers became notorious among Southerners for looting and vandalism, and they did much to shatter the illusion that the Confederate Army was successfully defending its territory on all fronts. The bummers' activities in Georgia and the Carolinas helped ensure that the South would be unable to sustain its war effort; additionally, bummers' destruction of industrial property rendered the garrisoning of southern cities largely unnecessary by destroying most, if not all, of those facilities in their path that replenished the Confederate war effort (such as cotton gins, farms, foundries, lumber mills, etc.).

One southern family's encounter with bummers was recorded by North Carolina resident and Civil War diarist Jane Evans Elliot:

Sherman admitted himself after the war that "many acts of pillage, robbery, and violence were committed" by the bummers.

Interpretation
Sherman’s veterans appropriated the belittling title bummer as a point of personal pride. On May 24, 1865, Sherman’s Army paraded for six hours through the Pennsylvania Avenue in Washington, D,C., during the Grand Review of the Union Armies on May 23–24, 1865. Union General Horace Porter called foraging during the Sherman's raid a "novel feature of Sherman's command . . . organized for a very useful purpose from the adventurous spirits which are always found in the ranks." Another Union General Henry Warner Slocum characterized the Sherman's March as "one great picnic from beginning to end” with "just enough fighting and danger of fighting to give zest to the experience." Union General Edward Follansbee Noyes said that in "this rollicking picnic expedition there was just enough of fighting for variety, enough of hardship to give zest to the repose which followed it, and enough of ludicrous adventure to make its memory a constant source of gratification."

The Southern portrayal of Sherman's bummers was quite the opposite and was epitomized by Margaret Mitchell in her novel Gone with the Wind.

A United States military education resource states:

References

External links 
 Sherman's "Bummers", Historical Times Encyclopedia of the Civil War
 Correspondence between Gen. Sherman and Gen. Hampton regarding foraging parties

Georgia (U.S. state) in the American Civil War
South Carolina in the American Civil War
North Carolina in the American Civil War